"Mister Kingdom" is a song in the symphonic rock genre written by the Electric Light Orchestra (ELO).

The song first appeared as the opening track of side 2, track number 6 from their 1974 album, Eldorado. It was the B-side to the 1977 hit "Turn to Stone", found on their album Out of the Blue.

On the single version, the solo slowly fades from 5:05 all the way to the very end at 5:29. On the Flashback boxset, the solo fades about 16 seconds earlier than the LP version, also cutting the small orchestra intro.

Some consider the song to have a similar style to The Beatles' song "Across the Universe". The song features an extended orchestral playout starting from 4:16 to 5:29, transitioning into Nobody's Child.

Jeff Lynne has said the following about the song and its subject:

References

1974 songs
Electric Light Orchestra songs
Song recordings produced by Jeff Lynne
Songs written by Jeff Lynne